Luís Manuel Capoulas Santos (born 22 August 1951, in Montemor-o-Novo), commonly known as Capoulas Santos, is a Portuguese politician, presently serving as Minister of Agriculture, Forests and Rural Development.

Life before politics

Capoulas Santos was born in Montemor-o-Novo. He is a licenciate in Sociology from the University of Évora. He worked as a secondary education teacher before taking a position as a technician in the Ministry of Agriculture.

Political activity

His political career started in 1976, after being elected as an alderman in his home city of Montemor-o-Novo.

He was first elected to the Assembly of the Republic in 1991, and took office as Minister of Agriculture in 1998, replacing Fernando Gomes da Silva, under whom he was Secretary of State. He kept the office until 2002, when the government led by António Guterres resigned after a landslide defeat in local elections.

Capoulas Santos was elected Member of the European Parliament for the Socialist Party; part of the Party of European Socialists, between 2004 and 2014.

He returned to the Ministry of Agriculture in 2015, after the nomination of António Costa as Prime Minister.

Honours

 Grand Cross of the Order of Entrepreneurial Merit, Category of Agricultural Merit (17/01/2006).

References

1951 births
Living people
People from Montemor-o-Novo
Socialist Party (Portugal) politicians
Agriculture ministers of Portugal
Members of the Assembly of the Republic (Portugal)
MEPs for Portugal 2004–2009
MEPs for Portugal 2009–2014
Socialist Party (Portugal) MEPs
University of Évora alumni